Identity: First Sight is the debut extended play by South Korean boy group WEi. It was released by Oui Entertainment on October 5, 2020 and contains five tracks, including the lead single "Twilight".

Background and release 
On June 17, 2020, Oui Entertainment announced it would be debuting a new boy group. On September 11, it was announced the group would release their debut extended play Identity: First Sight on October 5. On September 25, the track list was released, with "Twilight" announced as the lead single. Four days later, the highlight medley video was released. Music video teasers for the lead single were released on September 28 and October 4, respectively.

Composition 
Identity: First Sight consists of five tracks that incorporates various genres. The lead single "Twilight" is a pop music song with an alternative R&B element. The second track "Doremifa" is an upbeat love song of the futurepop genre based on a New jack swing rhythm. The third track "Timeless" is described as a warm and sentimental fan song. The fourth track "Hug You" is a future dance song that features the harmonious vocals of the members. The fifth track "Fuze" is a EDM genre song produced by member Jang Dae-hyeon.

Promotion 
Following the release of Identity: First Sight, WEi held an online showcase on the same date to introduce the extended play and communicate with their fans. The group performed "Twilight" and "Fuze" during the showcase. The group's promotions for the song "Twilight" began on October 8, 2020, on Mnet's M Countdown. The B-side track "Fuze" was also performed during the group's first week of promotions. "Timeless" was performed on MBC M's Show Champion on October 21 and "Doremifa" was performed on January 12, 2021 to celebrate the group's 100 day anniversary since debut.

Track listing

Charts

Weekly charts

Monthly charts

Release history

References 

2020 EPs
2020 debut EPs
Korean-language EPs
K-pop EPs